is a Japanese fashion model and actor. She appeared in the national "What should I do to coordinate tomorrow?" campaign for the fashion magazine  in 2017 and 2018.

While attending Kagoshima Girl's High School, she was a member of the volleyball team that went to the national finals. Obama was a finalist for the 3rd Cover Girl Prize given out by Magazine Summit, a national organization for magazine publishers in Japan.

Obama has used her celebrity status to support products such as shōchū that are produced in Minamisatsuma.

Filmography

Film
Kids (2008)
MW (2009, Kanako)

Television
Nodame Cantabile (2006, guest star)
Shika Otoko A wo Niyoshi (2008, Kako Harawa)
Rinjō (2009, Sayoko Kataoka, based on the short story collection from Hideo Yokoyama)

References

1984 births
21st-century Japanese actresses
Japanese female models
Japanese film actresses
Japanese television actresses
Models from Kagoshima Prefecture
Living people